Dynamic load testing (or dynamic loading) is a method to assess a pile's bearing capacity by applying a dynamic load to the pile head (a falling mass) while recording acceleration and strain on the pile head. Dynamic load testing is a high strain dynamic test which can be applied after pile installation for concrete piles. For steel or timber piles, dynamic load testing can be done during installation or after installation.

The procedure is standardized by ASTM D4945-00 Standard Test Method for High Strain Dynamic Testing of Piles. It may be performed on all piles, regardless of their installation method.  In addition to bearing capacity, Dynamic Load Testing gives information on resistance distribution (shaft resistance and end bearing) and evaluates the shape and integrity of the foundation element.

The foundation bearing capacity results obtained with dynamic load tests correlate well with the results of static load tests performed on the same foundation element.

See also
 Pile integrity test

References
 Rausche, F., Moses, F., Goble, G. G., September, 1972. Soil Resistance Predictions From Pile Dynamics. Journal of the Soil Mechanics and Foundations Division, American Society of Civil Engineers. Reprinted in Current Practices and Future Trends in Deep Foundations, Geotechnical Special Publication No. 125, DiMaggio, J. A., and Hussein, M. H., Eds, August, 2004. American Society of Civil Engineers: Reston, VA; 418–440.
 Rausche, F., Goble, G.G. and Likins, G.E., Jr. (1985). Dynamic Determination of Pile Capacity. Journal of the Geotechnical Engineering Division, 111(3), 367–383.
 Salgado, R. (2008). The Engineering of Foundations. New York:McGraw-Hill, Chapter 14 (pp. 669-713).
 Scanlan, R.H., and Tomko, J.J., 1960, "Dynamic Prediction of Pile Static Bearing Capacity", Journal of the Soil Mechanics and Foundations Division, American Society of Civil Engineers, Vol. 86, No. SM4; 35-61

External links
Instrumentation and Pictures of Dynamic Load Test of Piles

In situ foundation tests
Deep foundations